In the United Kingdom, death by misadventure is the recorded manner of death for an accidental death caused by a risk taken voluntarily.

Misadventure in English law, as recorded by coroners and on death certificates and associated documents, is a death that is primarily attributed to an accident that occurred due to a risk that was taken voluntarily. In contrast, when the manner of death is given as an accident, the coroner has determined that the decedent had taken no unreasonable willful risk.

"Misadventure may be the right conclusion when a death arises from some deliberate human act which unexpectedly and unintentionally goes wrong."

Legally defined manner of death: a way by which an actual cause of death (trauma, exposure, etc.) was allowed to occur. For example, a death caused by an illicit drug overdose may be ruled a death by misadventure, as the user took the risk of drug usage voluntarily. Misadventure is a form of unnatural death, a category that also includes accidental death, suicide, and homicide.

In the case of R v Wolverhampton Coroner, it was held that the coroner must establish death by misadventure on the balance of probabilities or commonly known as "more likely than not". This is opposed to beyond reasonable doubt, which is used elsewhere.

See also 

 Darwin Awards, given for those who kill themselves in "idiotic" ways

References

Misadventure
Medical terminology